Zaitunia akhanii is a species of the araneomorph spider family Filistatidae (crevice weaver spiders).

Distribution 
This species is endemic to Tehran Province, Iran.

Description 
The female holotype measured 5.2 mm.

Etymology 
This species was named after Iranian botanist Hossein Akhani.

References 

Filistatidae
Endemic fauna of Iran
Spiders of Asia
Spiders described in 2015